Da-som is a Korean feminine given name. Unlike most Korean names, which are composed of two Sino-Korean roots each written with one hanja, "Da-som" is an indigenous Korean name: a single word meaning "love". It is an older variation of the South Korean name Sa-rang; both names carry the meaning of "love". It is one of a number of such indigenous names which became more popular in South Korea in the late 20th century.

People
People with this name include:
 Kim Da-som (born 1993), South Korean actress and singer, former member of girl group Sistar

Fictional characters
Fictional characters with this name include:
 Choi Da-som, in the 2020 South Korean television series Welcome

See also
Sa-rang (Korean given name)
List of Korean given names

References

Given names
Korean feminine given names